Rainbow Brite is a media franchise by Hallmark Cards, introduced in 1984. The animated Rainbow Brite television series first aired in 1984, the same year Hallmark licensed Rainbow Brite to Mattel for a range of dolls and other merchandise. A theatrical feature-length film, Rainbow Brite and the Star Stealer, was released by Warner Bros. in 1985. The franchise was rebooted in 2014 with a three part mini-series released on Hallmark's online streaming video service, Feeln. A line of new merchandise by Hallmark online and in its shops debuted in 2015.

Production

Rainbow Brite made her animated debut in the syndicated prime-time television special, "Peril in the Pits," which was first aired on June 27, 1984. Later, a pair of two-part specials were produced: "The Mighty Monstromurk Menace" and "The Beginning of Rainbowland."

A theatrical feature-length film, Rainbow Brite and the Star Stealer, was released by Warner Bros. in 1985. The specials became part of DIC's weekly syndicated Kideo TV block of programming starting in April 1986, which were followed up with eight more episodes for a total of thirteen, which is one season in American television, and were rerun until the end of March 1987, after which the show was replaced on the Kideo TV schedule by Lady Lovely Locks & the Pixietails. All were published on VHS videotapes in the United States and other countries, along with two live-action programs. One of these was a program intended for use at kids' birthday parties ("It's Your Birthday Party"); the other was made on location at the San Diego Zoo ("San Diego Zoo Adventure").

Premise
In Gen 1 continuity, and most of the franchise's backstory, a young girl named Wisp is brought to a gray, desolate land with the mission to bring color to this fictional world by locating the Sphere of Light. Along the way, she befriends a furry creature (called a sprite) named Twink and a magnificent horse named Starlite and finds a mysterious baby who turns out to be the key to her mission. With the help of her new friends, Wisp locates the legendary Color Belt and rescues the seven Color Kids, who had been trapped by the King of Shadows. Using the Color Belt, Wisp and the Sphere of Light defeat the King of Shadows, liberate the sprites, and bring color and beauty to the land, henceforth called Rainbow Land. Wisp is renamed Rainbow Brite in honor of her new role as leader of the Color Kids, who are together in charge of all the colors in the universe.

The Color Kids spread color across the universe from the Color Console inside the Color Castle. Each Color Kid is in charge of their respective color, has a personal sprite and manages a number of like-colored sprites that mine Color Crystals from the nearby Color Caves. These crystals are processed into Star Sprinkles which are the essential components to brightening and coloring any object or place. Rainbow Brite and the Color Kids' mission is often complicated by the likes of Murky Dismal, his sidekick Lurky, and other villains. Brian, a boy from Earth, sometimes assisted Rainbow Brite in her adventures.

In the movie, Rainbow Brite and the Star Stealer, the setting expands to include the diamond planet, Spectra. All the light in the universe must pass through Spectra before coming to Earth. However, Earth soon falls into a wintry darkness when the diamond-obsessed Dark Princess decides to steal Spectra for her own. Rainbow Brite and her horse, Starlite, must team with Spectra's boy warrior, Krys, and his robotic horse, On-X, to defeat the powers of darkness and save Spectra, Earth, and the universe.

Gen 2 continuity took a radical departure from any other generation's story, focusing as much on ethnic diversity as the colors of the rainbow. Rainbow Brite had an entirely new and smaller group of friends called the Color Crew. Despite distribution and marketing in the United States, Canada, Europe, and Australia, the toy line never reached the success of its predecessor and ended after little more than a year.

Gen 3 was basically a relaunch of Gen 1 in 2003, with the same story, but a smaller range of characters produced. The dolls from Toy Play were similar to but not exact copies of the Gen 1 versions. There was also a sizable amount of Rainbow Brite merchandise from various other manufacturers just as in Gen 1.

Gen 4A celebrated the 25th anniversary of Rainbow Brite in 2009 with continuity returning the setting again to Rainbow Land, which looked nothing like the original version. This time, Rainbow Brite and her friends' mission was to bring hope and happiness to the far corners of the universe, making hearts lighter and worlds a little more colorful along the way. The story focuses on Rainbow Brite, Tickled Pink, and Moonglow, each representing one of Rainbow Land's Sky Powers, which determine the cycles of the days and seasons. Gen 4 continuity makes Rainbow Brite a girl originally from Earth (Return to Rainbow Land). Rainbow Brite's absence from the world is explained in a story that sees Rainbow return to her home on Earth for a brief visit with her family after many adventures spreading color throughout Rainbow Land and the universe. But when the Dark Princess erases Rainbow Land from Rainbow Brite's memory while on Earth, she never returns to her duties in Rainbow Land. Rainbow Brite eventually returns to Rainbow Land with the help of Starlite and Puppy Brite. These dolls had a more mature fashion doll-like design, which was totally unlike all of the previous dolls in the series. The three girl dolls were wearing training bras and panties under their clothes. The line suffered a delay, which caused the toys to not be available until after the holiday season that year. It saw scarce distribution as retailers were not impressed with it and was canceled after just seven months and before the first release was completed.

Feeln's (part of Hallmark) Gen 4B animated reboot retained most Gen 1 story elements and recognizable but not identical character designs. It introduced a few new story elements, one being the Sentinels of Light, which included Rainbow Brite as a guardian of light and color and Krys as the protector of light unseen. Stormy also played a more prominent role. After a falling out with her pal, Rainbow Brite, Stormy joined the forces of darkness and became a formidable frenemy. As the Dark Princess's manipulations became more transparent, Stormy started questioning where her true loyalties lay and returned to Rainbow Land as Rainbow Brite's friend. Gen 4B consisted solely of web content from Hallmark and only resulted in a minuscule amount of give-away merchandise. None of the items were available for purchase.

Gen 5 began in 2015 with dolls and toys very similar to those of Gens 1 and 3. Hallmark worked on the design, storylines, distribution and sales which have, so far, been limited to Hallmark shops in the United States and Canada, and the Hallmark website. The line began with a limited production of Hallmark's Itty Bittys plush miniatures before expanding to larger Twink & Starlite plushes, a 16" Rainbow Brite doll, a series of hard cover story books, women's clothing, and an expansion of the Itty Bittys line. In the fall of 2016, Hallmark released a Stormy doll with her own horse.

Merchandise

First Generation: Mattel
For the first Rainbow Brite generation (1984–1987), Mattel produced the dolls and many of the toys along with a large line of school supplies only sold in Italy. Other Rainbow Brite licensed merchandise was produced by various companies. This included many story and activity books by Western Publishing (Little Golden Books), a number of puzzles, a line of costume jewelry, banks and suitcases by Kat's Meow, clothes, toys, games, doll and child furniture, radios, child cosmetics, linen, towels, personal care items, lamps, figurines, VHS videocassettes, audio cassettes, records, bicycles, bedding, curtains and much more sold in the United States, Canada and the United Kingdom. The rest of Europe saw a smaller variety of merchandise, though this varied from country to country.

Books, comic books, sticker albums and audio tapes were the best selling licensed items outside the United Kingdom, but other items did exist in different countries. In Germany alone there were no less than thirty-one story cassettes and forty-six comic books. Germany also had an exclusive version of the Dress Up Rainbow Brite doll that included a story cassette. This cassette was not sold separately but was produced by Europa, producer of the other 30 story cassettes. It is unknown if the cassettes were sent to the Asian factory that made the dolls or were put into the dolls' boxes in Germany. A line of five 3D erasers in the form of various Rainbow Brite characters was sold in Europe with Mattel branding, while the same line was also sold in Australia under the name of Harveston Super Action figures with the addition of an additional character (Lurky) not sold in Europe. A number of Gen 1B (the second release of the first generation) dolls made for the American and Mexican markets ended up being sold in Germany because of strong demand there. These dolls had their English or Spanish names covered by a sticker with the German name or sometimes nothing at all. Two Rainbow Brite dolls plus Twink and Starlite were also produced in Brazil by Estrella. These were not exported anywhere and came in their own unique white packaging with all writing less the Rainbow Brite name in the Brazilian version of Portuguese. Because of Rainbow Brite's extreme popularity soon after she was launched, a number of other companies not related to Mattel produced many unlicensed lookalike (fake or bootleg) items that were sold in North America and Europe.

The Mattel line of toys and dolls was quite large. There were three large dolls, five medium dolls (Emotions) 12 small dolls, nine animals, 50 sprites (including those that came with the small dolls), four large boxed toys, ten boxed wallhangings and doll carriers, and 27 small carded toys for a total of 111 different items and this does not include generational (some dolls were sold in two different boxes over time in some markets) and international packaging variations. These toys were expensive for their time and Mattel responded by producing a lower priced line of toys sold loose with tags called the 'Emotions' line. The Emotions line included five dolls including a 15" Buddy Blue doll that was sold only in Canada. The extra sprite in the line happened to be Champ. Also included were five Sprites, Starlite the horse and Lurky. Oddly enough, the Emotions dolls were larger than the small dolls in the regular line, but the Emotions horse was smaller than the normal version. As such the Emotions dolls were neither in scale with the Emotions horse or the regular Mattel version. And of course the Emotions dolls were too big to sit on the Emotions horse or the normal one. Not all toys were sold in all markets, and the Emotions line was never sold outside the United States and Canada.

Mattel's Dress Up line of dolls and horses is the most sought after part of the entire Mattel line, particularly Moonglow who was only sold in Germany. Although Stormy's doll was shown in the Mattel catalog and on the backs of the Dress Up doll boxes, she was never produced for retail even though the character did appear in some cartoon episodes and several German comic books. There was also a line of cataloged clothing for the Dress Up dolls, but like Stormy, it was never produced. The two horses, Starlight and Sunriser, were made from hard plastic rather than being stuffed. They were in fact from Mattel's line of 'Barbie' merchandise. The Dress Up line was only made for about one year. That makes the two horses and Moonglow very difficult to find today, especially MIB. The Tickled Pink and Rainbow Brite Dress Up dolls are somewhat difficult to find these days compared to the rest of the Gen 1 line.

Televised commercials for Mattel's Rainbow Brite dolls frequently featured the song, "Over the Rainbow," from The Wizard of Oz, often with altered lyrics or arrangements. Child actors Tracey Gold, Kellie Martin and Heather O'Rourke, famous for their roles in 1980s television and film, also appeared.

Second Generation: Up, Up and Away
The second Rainbow Brite generation (1996–1997) greatly differed from any generation before or since. It used the Rainbow Brite name but not the same characters or backstory. The master license was held by Up, Up and Away, a company which is no longer in business.

Rainbow Brite no longer had anything do with making colors and was now in charge of diversity. Although this version did have rainbow-colored hair, the characters resembled real-world children more than their previous animated and doll counterparts. In the second generation's story, Rainbow Brite had four friends, called the Color Crew, which included Amber (Latina), Cerise (Asian), Ebony (African-American) and Indigo (Middle Eastern, the only character name borrowed from the original Color Kids).

Rainbow Brite was produced as large and small dolls while the Color Crew was represented only in the small doll range. The large Rainbow Brite dolls came with three pots of Color-Glo Paint and a brush, while the small dolls included a single pot of Color-Glo Paint and a brush. The large doll was released in two different boxes, the first lacking a window so buyers could not see the doll inside. As the doll was sold with three different wardrobes, buying one was a gamble regarding which look she would have (unless one read the small code box on the bottom of the package indicating the doll's shoe color). The large doll later came in a window box with a simplified single wardrobe. The small dolls came boxed at first and then blister carded on two different types of cards. They are noted for being the only Rainbow Brite dolls ever produced with Dutch text on the packaging.

The Canadian importer was Irvine, a company which is currently still in business, and their product packaging was printed in both French and English texts. Ideal Toy Company was the importer for most of Western Europe, though Euro Play imported the line for Germany. The large doll was also distributed in Italy by GiG with only Italian text on the box. There were no other toys or accessories for the second generation dolls other than additional pots of Color-Glo Paint, which were sold in the United States, Canada, Europe and Australia. There was also a version of at least the large doll in a box with Spanish-only text. Another 15" Rainbow Brite doll with a Color Glo Bear and paint set was prototyped, as was a black version, which was produced in very small numbers. But only the black version was ever produced and then in very limited numbers. There was a Gen 2B which had simplified packaging and outfits as an effort to keep the line going by cutting costs. The second generation had nowhere near the success the first generation had at retail and was discontinued after less than two years on the market.

Third Generation: Toy Play
The third Rainbow Brite generation (2003–2005) was also the 20th Anniversary Release. The master toy licensee was Toy Play, a defunct subsidiary of The Betesh Group. The parent company is still in business. Nick Jr. was the television network that advertised the line. Hot Topic was the lead merchandiser with a unique Rainbow Brite doll not manufactured by Toy Play and many items of women's clothing, accessories and stationary.

Without being an exact copy of the originals, this generation returned to the look and feel of the Mattel line even if the product line was much narrower than the first generation. Toy Play followed the first generation's character roll out, producing Rainbow Brite, Red Butler, Canary Yellow and Patty O'Green characters but no more Color Kids followed. Starlite, Puppy Brite and the Sprites were also represented in various merchandise.

Characters were produced in different sizes, from three to twenty-eight inches tall across the line which went from PVC plastic figurines to plush dolls. Toy Play produced both retro-style plush dolls with wiring in their limbs to make them poseable along with plastic dolls wearing soft clothing and having articulated arms and legs. Some dolls were sold with a Region 1 DVD in English featuring a single episode of the original cartoon. Some Toy Play products were sold in Canada with English-French packaging. Toy Play's 18 inch talking Rainbow Brite doll notoriously omitted the color green when 'speaking' all of the colors of the rainbow. Toy Play indicated that the missing color would be added for future production runs, but this never happened because the line died out before a corrected version appeared.

Toy Play was the first (and so far only) merchandiser to produce a Color Castle playset, the Light Up Musical Castle, which included small articulated figurines of Rainbow Brite, Red Butler, Twink and Puppy Brite. The playset's box showed pictures of forthcoming product (a Rainbow Brite and Friends Sprites' village playset, an in-scale Starlite with brushable mane, as well as figurine 2-packs to include Rainbow Brite and Twink, Red Butler and Romeo, Patty O'Green and Lucky, Canary Yellow and Spark, and Murky Dismal and Lurky) though these were never produced. There was also a wide range of other merchandise, mostly clothing, that was available during Gen 3.

Fourth Generation: Playmates Toys
The fourth Rainbow Brite generation (2009–2010) was the 25th anniversary release and was accompanied by a series of web-episodes produced by Animax Entertainment that were available to stream on www.RainbowBrite.com., which no longer exists. The master toy license belonged to Playmates Toys and their line of Rainbow Brite toys was expected to be in stores in the fall of 2009. Production delays saw the line actually debut in stores on December 24 of that year, which of course missed the 2009 holiday shopping season.

The line's initial product release only included three plastic fashion dolls (Rainbow Brite, Tickled Pink, and Moonglow) and three plastic horses with rooted manes (Starlite, Sunriser, and Shimmer). A larger 15" Rainbow Brite doll was also produced. The line initially omitted the Color Kids altogether in favor of a more sky-power oriented storyline. The packaging art hinted at a possible Stormy doll to come, though yet again she never arrived.

The Playmates line never caught on with its target audience. Most retailers refused to carry the line and those that did saw stock run out by July 2010. If any reorders were placed, they were not in quantities that justified continued production. The line was only on the market for about seven months and was not available in all of the Contiguous United States.

In the Fall of 2010 three Sprite dolls appeared at retail in Mexico. These included Twinkle (a renamed Twink) for Rainbow Brite, Nite Sprite for Moonglow and Twilite for Tickled Pink. These were already in production when US retailers dropped the line. The fourth generation saw a number of licensed products similar to the third generation, some in the original Gen 1 style and some in the new Gen 4 style. This included mostly clothing and stationary, plus a small bicycle. The final products during the fourth generation came from Madame Alexander, and included a traditional Madame Alexander-style Gen 1 Rainbow Brite doll with Twink, as well as Gen 4-style plush dolls of Rainbow Brite and Tickled Pink.

Feeln

A three-part animated miniseries was launched on November 6, 2014 by Video On Demand site Feeln. The reboot showcased updated character designs for the cast, and starred Emily Osment as the voice of Rainbow Brite and Molly Ringwald as the voice of Dark Princess. The second episode was shown on November 13, 2014 and the series concluded on November 20, 2014.

Fifth Generation: Hallmark Toys
Hallmark introduced the fifth generation of Rainbow Brite toys, along with clothing and other merchandise in July 2015. A limited edition line of Rainbow Brite Itty Bittys featuring Rainbow Brite, Twink, Champ, O.J., Lucky and I.Q. arrived first, each produced in limited quantities of 500 units. The demand led to Hallmark reissuing the Itty Bittys with slightly revised designs in much greater numbers along with the first Rainbow Brite Itty Bittys boxed set featuring Red Butler, Romeo, Indigo and Hammy. These items were followed by an 8" Twink plush and 11" Starlite plush in September 2015, as well as a 16" Rainbow Brite doll that November.

In 2016 Hallmark released another Itty Bitty boxed set featuring Patty O'Green, Buddy Blue, Lucky & Champ. A 24" Rainbow Brite Jumbo Itty Bitty arrived in December. A limited edition Shy Violet Itty Bitty was released as a Hallmark online exclusive that Summer. In Fall of 2016 many new Rainbow Brite items were available at Hallmark stores and online, including several new story and activity books, a new range of greeting cards, and a 1,000 piece Rainbow Land puzzle. A Starlite Itty Bitty was released in November, as well as 11" Sunriser and Skydancer plushes, and for the first time ever a 16" Stormy doll. Packaging for the single items consists only of attached tags with the product name, Hallmark logo, copyright notice and barcode, while the boxed sets feature Rainbow Land displayable backgrounds. These toys are sold only in the United States and Canada. Additionally, Hallmark Keepsake Rainbow Brite holiday ornaments were sold in 2015 (a reissue of Hallmark's 2013 ornament) and 2016.

A Rainbow Brite comic was published by Dynamite Entertainment for five issues from October 2018 to February 2019.

Notes

References

External links

 Rainbow Brite.Net
 Rainbow Brite.Co.Uk
 
Rainbow Brite at Don Markstein's Toonopedia. Archived from the original on November 4, 2016.

1980s toys
1990s toys
2000s toys
2010s toys
Fairies and sprites in popular culture
Hallmark Cards
Mass media franchises introduced in 1984
English-language television shows